Monroe Township is one of the fifteen townships of Adams County, Ohio, United States.  As of the 2010 census the population was 686.

Geography
Located in the southern part of the county along the Ohio River, it borders the following townships:
Tiffin Township - north
Brush Creek Township - northeast
Green Township - east
Manchester Township - southwest
Sprigg Township - west
Liberty Township - northwest
Lewis County, Kentucky lies across the Ohio River to the south.

No municipalities are located in Monroe Township.

History
Monroe Township was organized in 1817. It is named for James Monroe.

It is one of twenty-two Monroe Townships statewide.

Government
The township is governed by a three-member board of trustees, who are elected in November of odd-numbered years to a four-year term beginning on the following January 1. Two are elected in the year after the presidential election and one is elected in the year before it. There is also an elected township fiscal officer, who serves a four-year term beginning on April 1 of the year after the election, which is held in November of the year before the presidential election. Vacancies in the fiscal officership or on the board of trustees are filled by the remaining trustees.

References

External links
County website

Townships in Adams County, Ohio
1817 establishments in Ohio
Populated places established in 1817
Townships in Ohio